Aya is the third studio album from French singer Aya Nakamura. It was released on 13 November 2020 through Warner Music France.

The album features guest appearances by Stormzy, Ms Banks and Oboy. It was preceded by the singles "Jolie nana" and "Doudou", both of which reached the top 10 in Nakamura's home country France.

Background and promotion
On 15 October 2020, Nakamura announced the album through her social media accounts. About the recording process, her boyfriend and producer Vladimir Boudnikoff revealed: "We spent days, nights, weeks in the studio on this album. And if there is one thing I can guarantee you, there is immense talent behind this woman". Nakamura herself explained: "I had a lot of fun, I've tried a lot of stuff, wanted to test some things like on "Doudou". I can't wait to see my fans again because I think they will be surprised." The album received advertising billboards on Times Square on 13 November.

Track listing

Physical edition bonus tracks
 "Criminel"
 "Plus la même"

Charts

Weekly charts

Year-end charts

Certifications

References

2020 albums
Aya Nakamura albums